Charles Doty (August 17, 1824 – December 17, 1918) was a Wisconsin pioneer, surveyor, United States military officer, and state legislator.

Doty was born in Green Bay, Michigan Territory, on August 17, 1824 and was a descendant of Mayflower immigrant Edward Doty. He was trained to be a civil engineer and surveyor in Derry, New Hampshire. He was the son of Wisconsin territorial governor James Duane Doty and served as his father's private secretary. Doty married Sarah Jane Webster in 1846, and they had three sons. He served in the United States Army during the Civil War. After the war, Doty took inventory of supplies for the Native Americans and eventually retired to St. Andrews in Bay County, Florida, where he died.

In 1848, he served in the 1st Wisconsin Legislature as a Whig member of the Wisconsin State Assembly.

Notes

External links

People of Wisconsin in the American Civil War
Politicians from Green Bay, Wisconsin
People from Bay County, Florida
Members of the Wisconsin State Assembly
1824 births
1918 deaths
Wisconsin Whigs
19th-century American politicians